The Beijing Liao and Jin Dynasty City Wall Museum (Chinese: 北京辽金城垣博物馆) is a museum built over the ruins of Beijing's Liao and Jin dynasty (1115–1234) city wall. The museum is located at No.41 Yulinli, Yulin South Road, in Fengtai District of southwestern Beijing, near the north bank of the Liangshui River.

History
During the 12th century, the city of Beijing was centered to the southwest of the present day metropolis in southern Xicheng District (formerly Xuanwu District) and Fengtai District.  The city known as Zhongdu was the capital of the Jin Dynasty.  In 1990, the remnants of a water gate in the city wall of Zhongdu was discovered at the site.  The museum built over the water gate opened in 1995.

Display
The museum's display space of 2,500 square meter is primarily underground.  The remnants of the water gate, a wood and stone structure, is 43.4 m in length with a tunnel that is 21 m long and 7.7 m wide.  The museum also showcases Liao and Jin era artifacts unearthed in and around Beijing.

Access
Admission to the museum is free.

Transport
The nearest metro station is Jingfengmen station on Lines 14 and 19 of Beijing Subway, 500 m to the east.

The nearest bus stops are Youanmenwai, 500 m to the east (Bus No. 19, 48, 72, 88, 377, 454, 474) and Daguanyuan (Grand View Garden) 800 m to the north (Bus No. 53, 59, 63, 84, 122, 458, 474, 717, 939, 特3, 特12, 运通102).

See also

 History of Beijing
 Beijing city fortifications
 List of museums in China
 Ming City Wall Relics Park

Notes

1995 establishments in China
Museums in Beijing
History museums in China
Major National Historical and Cultural Sites in Beijing